Lugny-Bourbonnais is a commune in the Cher department in the Centre-Val de Loire region of France.

Geography
The river forms all of the southeastern border of the commune.

Population

Sights
 The remains of the church, now part of a farm.
 A watermill.

See also
Communes of the Cher department

References

Communes of Cher (department)